Adolfo Javier Zeoli Martínez (born 2 May 1962 in Montevideo) is a former Uruguayan footballer.

International career
Zeoli made 14 appearances for the senior Uruguay national football team from 1988 to 1990, and he was a member of the squad at the 1990 FIFA World Cup finals. He also played in the 1989 Copa América.

References

 

1962 births
Living people
Uruguayan footballers
Uruguayan expatriate footballers
Uruguay under-20 international footballers
Uruguay international footballers
1990 FIFA World Cup players
1989 Copa América players
Danubio F.C. players
Club Nacional de Football players
CD Tenerife players
Talleres de Córdoba footballers
Deportivo Mandiyú footballers
Club Atlético River Plate footballers
Club Bolívar players
Club Deportivo Palestino footballers
Uruguayan Primera División players
La Liga players
Argentine Primera División players
Association football goalkeepers
Expatriate footballers in Argentina
Expatriate footballers in Bolivia
Expatriate footballers in Chile
Expatriate footballers in Spain
Uruguayan expatriate sportspeople in Argentina
Uruguayan expatriate sportspeople in Bolivia
Uruguayan expatriate sportspeople in Chile
Uruguayan expatriate sportspeople in Spain
Footballers from Montevideo